Strange Inheritance or The Traveller on All Saints' Day (French: Le voyageur de la Toussaint) is a 1941 mystery novel by the Belgian writer Georges Simenon. It was translated into English by Geoffrey Sainsbury.

Synopsis
On All Saint's Day Gilles Mauvoisin returns home from Norway to his hometown of La Rochelle on the western coast of France. He discovers that his uncle had died several months earlier leaving him his fortune, including a transport company and his house on condition that he allows his family to keep living there. Gilles soon finds that his family are snobbish and resentful, and appear to be hiding a secret about his uncle's death.

Film adaptation
In 1943 it was made into a film Strange Inheritance directed by Louis Daquin and starring Assia Noris and Jules Berry. Henri-Georges Clouzot had earlier attempted to persuade Continental Films to acquire the rights so he could make a film launching a savage attack on French society, however they preferred to purchase the Maigret novels for a series of adaptations.

References

Bibliography
 Drazin, Charles . The Faber Book of French Cinema. London: Faber & Faber, 2011.
 Goble, Alan. The Complete Index to Literary Sources in Film. Walter de Gruyter, 1999.
 Pendergast, Sara & Pendergast, Tom. Reference Guide to World Literature: Authors. St. James Press, 2003.

1941 Belgian novels
1941 French novels
Novels by Georges Simenon
Belgian novels adapted into films
Novels set in France

fr:Le voyageur de la Toussaint